The French 18th Army Corps was a French military unit created in November 1870 by the vice admiral Fourichon.

Commanders

1870s 
 1870 : Général Crouzat
 1870 : Général Abdelal
 1870 : Général Bourbaki
 1870 : Général Billot
 1873 : Général d'Aurelle de Paladines
 1874 - 1877 : Général de Rochebouët
 1878 : Général Berthaut

World War I
General de Maud’huy (4 September 1914 – 29 September 1914)
General Marjoulet (30 September 1914 – 19 June 1916)
General Hirschauer (20 June 1916 – 21 August 1917)
General d'Armau de Pouydraguin (22 August 1917 – 25 November 1920)
General Graziani (1 December 1920 – 26 November 1921)

World War II 
 
September 1939 : Général Rochard 
May - June 1940 : Général Doyen
June - July 1940 : Général Viant

018
Corps of France in World War I